The following lists events in the year 2021 in Venezuela.

Incumbents
President: Nicolás Maduro, Juan Guaidó (presidential crisis)
 Vice President: Delcy Rodríguez

Governors
Amazonas: Miguel Rodríguez
Anzoátegui: Antonio Barreto Sira
Apure: Ramón Carrizales
Aragua: Rodolfo Clemente Marco Torres and Daniela González
Barinas: Argenis Chávez
Bolívar: Justo Noguera Pietri
Carabobo: Rafael Lacava
Cojedes: Margaud Godoy
Delta Amacuro: Lizeta Hernández
Falcón: Víctor Clark
Guárico: José Manuel Vásquez
Lara: Adolfo Pereira Antique
Mérida: Ramón Guevara
Miranda: Héctor Rodríguez
Monagas: Yelitza Santaella and Cosme Arzolay
Nueva Esparta: Alfredo Díaz
Portuguesa: Rafael Calles
Sucre: Edwin Rojas
Táchira: Laidy Gómez
Trujillo: Henry Rangel Silva
Vargas: José Manuel Suárez
Yaracuy: Julio León Heredia
Zulia: Omar Prieto

Events

January and February
January 6
The European Union (EU) no longer recognizes Juan Guaidó as head of government. They also do not recognize the legitimacy of Nicolas Maduro. The United States and the United Kingdom still recognize Guaidó.
The Venezuelan government said it "expresses its concern with the acts of violence that are taking [place] in the city of Washington, United States."
January 7 – An Iranian ship arrives at the port of La Guaira in defiance of a boycott by the United States.
January 8 – La Vega raid
January 17 – COVID-19 pandemic: Six trucks carrying 136,000 liters of oxygen (14,000 individual canisters) set off for Manaus, Amazonas, Brazil.
January 19
U.S. President Donald Trump protects Venezuelan citizens living in the U.S. from deportation for 18 months.
Antony Blinken, President-elect Joe Biden's United States Secretary of State, says that the U.S. will continue to recognize Juan Guaidó as legitimate president of Venezuela.
January 21 – The European Parliament votes 391 votes in favor, 114 against, and 177 abstentions on a non-binding resolution calling on EU governments to recognize Juan Guaidó as Venezuela's interim president.
January 29 – Some banks issue debit cards in U.S. dollars as a remedy for hyperinflation.
February 11 – The United States Department of Justice (DOJ) reveals that in 2020 it sold 1.2 million barrels of Iranian oil destined for Venezuela to compensate victims of state-sponsored terrorism.
February 13 – Twelve Pemon men arrested in 2020 in relation to an attack on a military base in Kumarakapay, Bolívar state, are released.
February 19 – Maduro offers to sell natural gas to Mexico following a shortage related to the February 13–17, 2021 North American winter storm.
February 21 – Two paramilitary groups, Autodefensas Gaitanistas del Cartel del Golfo and Los Rastrojos join forces against the Venezuelan Army (ELN) in Táchira.
February 22 – The EU adds 19 officials to its list of 55 who have been sanctioned for undermining democracy or rights violations.
February 24 – Venezuela expels Isabel Brilhante Pedrosa, EU ambassador to Venezuela.

March and April
March 6
The government issues three new bills, worth 200,000, 500,000, and 1,000,000 bolivars. The last is worth US$0.52.
President Maduro and First Lady Cilia Flores receive their first doses of Russia's Sputnik V COVID-19 vaccine. The country has received 200,000 doses of the Sputnik V vaccine since February 13 and 500,000 doses of China's Sinopharm BIBP vaccine, which arrived this week. The country reports 141,356 cases of COVID-19 and 1,371 deaths, although critics say the actual numbers are much higher.
March 8
The Biden administration grants temporary protected status to 320,000 Venezuelans living in the U.S. This is more encompassing than the deferred deportation temporarily offered to 145,000 Venezuelans by Trump.
Ana Rosario Contreras, human rights activist and nurse, is awarded the International Women of Courage Award.
March 21 – 2021 Apure clashes: Fighting between FARC and Venezuelan security forces.
March 27 – Facebook freezes President Maduro's account for thirty days after spreading false information about a COVID-19 miracle cure.
March 28 – Juan Guaidó confirms he has tested positive for COVID-19.
April 20 – With over 32.3% of Venezuelans food insecure, the United Nations World Food Programme (WFP) gains permission from the Government of Venezuela to feed over 185,000 students by the end of 2021 and 1.5 million students by end of the 2022–2023 school year through nutritious school meals.

Deaths

January and February
3 January – Salvador Franco, Indigenous rights leader; died in prison, tuberculosis.
8 January – Cástor Oswaldo Azuaje Pérez, 69, Roman Catholic prelate, Bishop of Roman Catholic Diocese of Trujillo (since 2012); COVID-19.
16 January – Pedro Trebbau, 91, German-born Venezuelan zoologist.
18 January – Henrique Salas Albornoz, 68, urologist; COVID-19.
31 January – Douglas Bravo, 88, guerrilla fighter (FALN), COVID-19.
2 February – Pastor Heydra, journalist and politician; complications from COVID-19.
9 February – José Luis Zambrano Padauy, 49, journalist; COVID-19.
15 February – Luis Hidalgo, mayor of Boconó (PSUV), Trujillo; COVID-19.

March and April
13 March – Daniela Figueredo, 19, detainee, gunshot.
20 March – Rito Jiménez, 70, politician, deputy (since 2020); COVID-19.
25 March – Gladys Castillo, 98, pediatrician, First Lady of Venezuela (1984–1988).
31 March – Gloria Lizárraga de Capriles, 76, politician, first mayor of the Baruta.
5 April – Henry Stephen, 79, singer; complications from COVID-19.
9 April
Daniel Benítez, 33, footballer (Deportivo Táchira, Deportivo La Guaira); cancer.
Helímenas de Jesús Rojo Paredes, 94, Roman Catholic prelate, bishop (1980–1995) and archbishop (1995–2001) of Calabozo.
Tulio Manuel Chirivella Varela, 88, Roman Catholic prelate, bishop of Margarita (1974–1982) and archbishop of Barquisimeto (1982–2007); COVID-19.

May and June 

 18 May – Yolanda Tortolero, politician, deputy; complications from COVID-19

July and August 

 1 August – Rossana Ordóñez, 70, journalist, pancreatic cancer.

Media 

 La última pieza, directed by Ricardo Muñoz Senior.

See also
COVID-19 pandemic in Venezuela
Hyperinflation in Venezuela
2021 in politics and government
2020s
2020s in political history

References

External links
 NY Democrat's ties to Maduro may help Biden unlock stalemate (by JOSHUA GOODMAN, Associated Press, January 13, 2021)

 
Venezuela
Venezuela
2020s in Venezuela
Years of the 21st century in Venezuela